Edward Parnell Buckley (9 February 1889 – 20 October 1932) was an Australian rules footballer who played with Melbourne in the Victorian Football League (VFL).

Notes

External links 

1889 births
Australian rules footballers from Victoria (Australia)
Melbourne Football Club players
Brighton Football Club players
1932 deaths
People from Mornington Peninsula